Heartbreaker's Hall of Fame is the first studio album by American country music singer Sunny Sweeney. It was self released in 2006, then re-released in 2007 via Big Machine Records. The album included the single "If I Could".

Content
"Please Be San Antone" was co-written by Emily Erwin (now known as Emily Robison) of the Dixie Chicks, and was previously recorded by Jim Lauderdale on his 1999 album Onward Through It All. "16th Avenue" was previously a Top 10 hit for Lacy J. Dalton from her 1982 album of the same name. "Mama's Opry" by Iris DeMent had appeared on DeMent's 1992 album Infamous Angel. Sweeney self-penned the title track “Heartbreakers Hall of Fame” and “Slow Swinging Western Tunes” as well as co-wrote “Ten Years Pass” with Elizabeth Mason.

Reception
The album has received favorable reviews from music critics.  Michael Berick, who reviewed the album for Allmusic, gave it four stars out of five, calling it "a refreshing slice of traditional honky tonk enlivened with a dollop of rock & roll energy[…]She has a strong idea of who she is as a singer and performer, and her instincts are proven correct on this impressive effort." Chris Willman of Entertainment Weekly gave it a B+ rating, calling it "the kind of roadhouse fare typically tagged 'too country for country'." Country Standard Time critic Stuart Munro gave a favorable review as well, noting the mix of material on the album, and describing Sweeney's voice as being "full of sass and syrupy twang."

Track listing

Personnel
 Lars Albrecht - electric guitar
 David Carroll - bass guitar
 Gary Wayne Claxton - background vocals
 Tommy Detamore - dobro, electric guitar, lap steel guitar, pedal steel guitar
 Skip Edwards - Hammond organ
 Bobby Flores - fiddle, mandolin
 D.B. Harris - background vocals 
 Terje Kinn - banjo
 Jim Lauderdale - background vocals
 Tom Lewis - drums, percussion
 Eddie "Scarlito" Perez - background vocals
 Casper Rawls - acoustic guitar, hi-string guitar
 Ted Roddy - harmonica
 Sunny Sweeney - lead vocals, background vocals

References

2007 debut albums
Big Machine Records albums
Sunny Sweeney albums